Gulf Islands Secondary School (GISS) is a grade 8 to 12 public school in School District 64 Gulf Islands in British Columbia, Canada.
It is located on Salt Spring Island and is attended by students from Saltspring Island, Pender Island, Galiano Island, Mayne Island and Saturna Island.  The school also has an International Education program and is home to the Gulf Islands School of Performing Arts (GISPA).
The GISS Improv Troupe has very close ties with Ladysmith Secondary School's drama department. GISS is also known for their cafeteria and culinary program, which has won a $1500 grant towards their garden and school composting.

In 2014 Salt Spring Community Energy raised money for the installation of a 21 kW solar PV system for the gym roof. It was the second largest publicly owned solar array at the time. The energy savings created an annual scholarship from the electrical bill savings.

References

External links
Gulf Islands Secondary School

High schools in British Columbia
Salt Spring Island
Educational institutions established in 1966
1966 establishments in British Columbia